Cirrhochrista etiennei is a moth of the family Crambidae. It was described by Pierre Viette in 1975 and it is endemic to Réunion.

The length of the wings is about 13 mm and the wingspan is about 26–28 mm. Adults are white, with a narrow brown stripe at the edge of the forewings.

See also
List of moths of Réunion

References

Moths described in 1975
Spilomelinae
Endemic fauna of Réunion
Moths of Réunion